William Harries may refer to:
 William H. Harries, U.S. Representative from Minnesota
 William Matthew Harries, member of both houses of the Parliament of the Cape of Good Hope
 Will Harries, Welsh rugby union player

See also
 William Harris (disambiguation)